Roberto C. Yap, S.J. known as "Father Bobby", is a Filipino economist and Jesuit who currently serves as the 31st president of the Ateneo de Manila University. He assumed office on August 1, 2020 and succeeded Fr. Jose Ramon Villarin. Prior to this, he was president of Xavier University - Ateneo de Cagayan.

Early life and education 
Fr. Bobby was born in Cebu, Philippines, on May 16, 1959. He earned his Bachelor of Arts degree in economics, cum laude, from the Ateneo de Manila University in 1980. He attended the New School for Social Research in New York, United States, graduating in 1988 with a Master of Arts degree in economics. He returned to the Ateneo de Manila to attend the Loyola School of Theology for a Bachelor of Sacred Theology degree, receiving the degree in 1992, summa cum laude. He also attended the John F. Kennedy School of Government of Harvard University in Cambridge, United States, and was conferred a Master of Public Policy degree in 1995. In 2002, he earned his Ph.D. in Economics from University College London.

As a Jesuit 
Fr. Bobby entered the Society of Jesus on May 30, 1982, and was ordained priest on March 14, 1992.

As an educator 
From 1980 to 1982, Fr. Bobby was an instructor at the Ateneo de Manila University High School. Since 2002, he has been an assistant professor at the Department of Economics of the Ateneo de Manila University, but is presently "on leave."

In 2011, became president of Xavier University – Ateneo de Cagayan. He is also a member of the board of trustees of the Ateneo de Davao University, Ateneo de Manila University, and the Ateneo de Zamboanga University.

As a Professional 
Fr. Bobby served and still serves in different capacities in church, academe, and research centers.

References 

20th-century Filipino Jesuits
20th-century Filipino economists
Harvard Kennedy School alumni
1959 births
Living people
People from Cebu
Ateneo de Manila University alumni
The New School alumni
Alumni of University College London
21st-century Filipino Jesuits
21st-century Filipino economists